Events from the year 1856 in France.

Incumbents
 Monarch – Napoleon III

Events
30 March - Treaty of Paris is signed by Russia and an alliance of the Ottoman Empire, the Kingdom of Sardinia, France, and the United Kingdom, settling the Crimean War.

Births
1 February - Louis-Anne-Jean Brocq, dermatologist (died 1928)
16 March - Napoléon Eugène, Prince Imperial, only child of Emperor Napoleon III of France and his Empress consort Eugénie de Montijo (died 1879)
24 April - Philippe Pétain, Marshal of France, later Chief of State of Vichy France (died 1951)
25 May - Louis Franchet d'Espérey, general during World War I (died 1942)
5 June - Gabrielle Réjane, actress (died 1920)
1 September - Louis-Ernest Dubois, Roman Catholic Cardinal and Archbishop of Paris (died 1929)
29 October - Jacques Curie, physicist (died 1941)

Full date unknown
Eugène Louis Bouvier, entomologist and carcinologist (died 1944)
Thérèse Humbert, fraudster (died 1918)

Deaths

January to June
4 January - Pierre Jean David, sculptor (born 1788)
6 January - Nicolas-Charles Bochsa, musician and composer (born 1789)
29 February - Auguste Chapdelaine, Christian missionary to China (born 1814)
March - Louise Rosalie Allan-Despreaux, actress (born 1810)
27 April - Louis Joseph César Ducornet, painter (born 1806)
3 May - Adolphe Adam, composer and music critic (born 1803)
12 May - Jacques Philippe Marie Binet, mathematician, physicist and astronomer (born 1786)
13 May - Jean Zuléma Amussat, surgeon (born 1796)
14 May - Théodore Guérin (Saint Theodora), missionary (born 1798)

July to December
8 October - Théodore Chassériau, painter (born 1819)
12 October - Jean Bachelot La Pylaie, botanist, explorer and archaeologist (born 1786)
4 November - Hippolyte Delaroche, painter (born 1797)
9 November - Étienne Cabet, philosopher and utopian socialist (born 1788)
25 December - Princess Elisabeth of Savoy-Carignan (born 1800)

Full date unknown
Jean-Baptiste-Joseph Duchesne, painter and miniaturist (born 1770)
Charles de Steuben, painter (born 1788)

References

1850s in France